Oshu Corporation (鴎州コーポレーション) is a company that manages cram schools based in Hiroshima Prefecture. Oshu Corporation is headquartered in Namikidōri, Naka-ku, Hiroshima.

Auckland International College (AIC), owned by Oshu Corporation, was established in 2003 in Auckland, New Zealand. It has about 300 students from 14 countries, including New Zealand, Japan, and Korea.

References

External links 
 
https://www.bloomberg.com/profiles/companies/OSHUCZ:JP-oshu-coroporeation-kk

Test preparation companies
Education in Japan
Schools in Japan
Private schools in Japan